Stefan Kalipha (born Stephen Siegfried Behrendt, 1940) is a Trinidad-born British actor who has been active since about 1970. He played Ramon, the Cigar Factory Foreman in the film Cuba (1979), Daoud in The Curse of King Tut's Tomb and Fat Larry in Babylon (both 1980). He also appeared as Hector González, a Cuban hitman, in the James Bond film For Your Eyes Only (1981). Kalipha's other film roles include Wali Dad in the The Crucifer of Blood (1991) and Buldeo in The Jungle Book (1994).

His television roles include Quiller, episode: "Objective Caribbean"  and Tales of the Unexpected, episode: "The Finger of Suspicion".

Early life
Stefan Kalipha was born Stephen Siegfried Behrendt in Trinidad in 1940 and spent his childhood in Port of Spain. He is of Indian, African, Portuguese, and German descent. He grew up with fellow creatives Horace Ové, his cousin, and Mustapha Matura, his best friend. Kalipha moved to England in 1959 and studied at East 15 Acting School. He took on his grandfather's name Kalipha.

Career

Television
In 1970, Kalipha played the part of Casey in an episode of the drama series Callan, entitled "Amos Green Must Live".  The role was of a disenfranchised young black man in London who had reached a tipping point about working, even though he had "five A levels and five O levels".
 
In 1977, Kalipha played the part of Reverend Henry Paul in a television series pilot called Meadowlark. It was a sitcom, based in Brixton, about a black married couple who were sharing their flat with an Irish woman. The 36-minute pilot, which also starred Oscar James, Joan Ann Maynard and Nina Baden-Semper, was never broadcast.

Kalipha was Stanley in the 1985 BBC TV production of Mustapha Matura's play Playboy of the West Indies, a role he repeated at the Court Theatre, Chicago in 1988.

In 1992, Kalipha had a recurring role as Jonathan Phelps in the series Prime Suspect.

In 2015, he appeared as Tobias in The Bastard Executioner.

Film
Kalipha's character Hector Gonzalez in the 1981 James Bond film For Your Eyes Only masquerades as a plane pilot who has the intention of killing British agent Sir Timothy Havelock and his family. In 1983, Kalipha appeared as the Data School Instructor in Superman III. In 1989, he played the part of the Hatay tank gunner in Indiana Jones and the Last Crusade.

Stage
As Ahmed, an efficient tour agent smoothing over the repercussions of violence among holidaymakers in a Moroccan tour villa, Kalipha appeared on stage in E. A. Whitehead's Mecca, presented at the Open Space Theatre, London, in 1977.

Personal life
Kalipha lives in Primrose Hill.

Filmography and theatre

References

External links

Living people
1940 births
20th-century British male actors
21st-century British male actors
Alumni of East 15 Acting School
Black British male actors
British male actors of Indian descent
British male film actors
British people of German descent
British people of Portuguese descent
British people of Trinidad and Tobago descent
British male television actors
Caribbean people of German descent
People from Port of Spain
Trinidad and Tobago film actors
Trinidad and Tobago emigrants to the United Kingdom
Trinidad and Tobago people of Indian descent
Trinidad and Tobago people of Portuguese descent
Trinidad and Tobago stage actors
Trinidad and Tobago television actors